Wesley C. Miller (December 27, 1894 – April 19, 1962) was an American sound engineer. He was nominated for four Academy Awards, three in the category Sound Recording and one for Best Effects, Special Effects.

Selected filmography
 Brigadoon (1954)
 Love Me or Leave Me (1955)
 Forbidden Planet (1956)
 Les Girls (1957)

References

External links

1894 births
1962 deaths
American audio engineers
Special effects people
People from Haverhill, Massachusetts
20th-century American engineers
Academy Award for Technical Achievement winners